Big Ben is a bell in Elizabeth Tower which is part of the Palace of Westminster in London, England.

Big Ben or Bigben may also refer to:

People with the nickname
 Ben Bishop (born 1986), American ice hockey goaltender
 Ben Bowen (2002–2005), American cancer patient
 Ben Caunt (1815–1861), English bare-knuckle boxer who became the "heavyweight" boxing champion known as the "Torkard Giant" and "Big Ben"
 Ben Johnson (Canadian sprinter) (born 1961), Jamaican-Canadian sprinter
 Ben Maller (born 1975), American national sports radio host
 Ben Roethlisberger (born 1982), former American football quarterback for the Pittsburgh Steelers
 Ben Wallace (basketball) (born 1974), American retired basketball player

Fictional characters
 Big Ben (comics), a British superhero
 Big Ben (G.I. Joe), in the G.I. Joe universe
 Big Ben the Clockwork Whale, in Rudolph's Shiny New Year and Rudolph and Frosty's Christmas in July

Other uses
 Big Ben (album), a 1965 album by Jorge Ben
 Big Ben (horse), a Canadian show jumping horse
 Big Ben (locomotive), a steam locomotive used in Australia
 Big Ben (card game), a patience or card solitaire game
 Big Ben (Heard Island), a volcanic massif in the southern Indian Ocean
 Bigben (computer), a Cray supercomputer
 Bigben Interactive, a video game company
 Project Big Ben, a British Second World War operation to reconstruct and evaluate captured missiles
 Big Ben, a model of alarm clock manufactured by Westclox

See also
 Big Ben Aden, a clock tower in Aden, Yemen
 Big Ben Bowen Highway or West Virginia Route 193
 Big Ben of Murshidabad or Clock Tower of Murshidabad
 Big Bend (disambiguation)

Lists of people by nickname